Asanobori Toshimitsu (born 3 June 1948 as Toshiaki Shimofuri) is a former sumo wrestler from Yubari, Hokkaidō, Japan. He made his professional debut in July 1963 and reached the top division in March 1969. His highest rank was maegashira 2. Upon retirement from active competition he became an elder in the Japan Sumo Association. He left the Sumo Association in June 1979.

Career record

See also
Glossary of sumo terms
List of past sumo wrestlers
List of sumo tournament second division champions

References

1948 births
Living people
Japanese sumo wrestlers
Sumo people from Hokkaido